The Cuenca Alimentadora del Distrito Nacional de Riego 043 Estado de Nayarit is a protected natural area in west-central Mexico. It extends across portions of southern Sierra Madre Occidental and the westernmost Trans-Mexican Volcanic Belt. It has an area of 23290.27 km2, covering portions of southern Durango, northern Jalisco, eastern Nayarit, southern Zacatecas, and western Aguascalientes states.

Geography
The protected area consists of many isolated blocks of land, mostly atop the north–south mountain ridges of the southern Sierra Madre Occidental. It includes portions of the Sierra Pajaritos, Sierra los Huicholes, Sierra Morones, and other ranges of the Sierra Madre Occidental. The easternmost range is the Sierra Fría, between the Juchipila and Verde rivers, where it adjoins the Cuenca Alimentadora del Distrito Nacional de Riego 01 Pabellón. These ranges are separated by broad river valleys, including the valleys of the San Pedro Mezquital River and several southward-flowing tributaries of the Río Grande de Santiago, including, from west to east, the Huaynamota and Atengo, Bolaños, Juchipila, and Verde.

It also includes portions of the westernmost Trans-Mexican Volcanic Belt, to the south between the Río Grande de Santiago and Ameca rivers.

Tipos de vegetación 
 bosque de coníferas
 bosque de encino
 bosque de pino de encino
 bosque de encino pino
 pastizal natural
 selva baja caducifolia
 bosque mesofilo de montaña
 palmar natural
 selva subcaducifolia
 vegetación hidrófila
 vegetación inducida
 selva caducifolia

Flora and fauna
The natural vegetation is pine–oak forest and woodland, with pines and/or oaks as the dominant trees, together with manzanillo (Arbutus spp.), juniper, and other plants. The forests vary with rainfall, altitude, and soils, and are home to numerous plant and animal species, including some endemic and limited-range species. Areas that have been logged are covered in thickets of manzanillo, and montane grasslands occur on canyon slopes. Dry forest extends up the river valleys from the coastal plain to the west, and matorral (dry shrubland) is found on the plateaus to the north and east.

Flora 
Pino piñonero, piñon (Pinus cembroides), Pino triste (Pinus lumholtzii), Pino colorado, teocote (Pinus teocote), Pino blanco (Pinus durangensis), Pino de navidad (Pinus ayacahuite), Cedro de San Juan (Cupressus lusitanica), Encino, encino jarrillo (Quercus laurina), Encino (Quercus rugosa), Biznaga cabeza de viejo (Mammilaria senilis), Pino real (Pinus engelmannii), Pino, ocote chino (Pinus leiophylla), Pino de chihuahua (Pinus chihuahuana), Cedro (Juniperus deppeana), Táscate (Juniperus durangensis), (Quercus resinosa), (Quercus potosina), (Quercus eduardii), (Quercus grisea), (Quercus sideroxyla), (Quercus chihuahuensis), (Quercus aristata), (Quercus uxoris), (Quercus gentry), (Artostaphylos pungens), Encino chaparro (Quercus microphylla), Ejechí (Mastichodendron capiri), Cedro (Cedrela odorata), (Bouteloua sp.), Acacia (Acacia spp.), Pino (Pinus spp.), (Juniperus spp.), (Quercus spp.), (Tabebuia chrysantha), Lapacho rosado (Handroanthus impetiginosus), Madroño (Arbutus xalapensis), (Amoreuxia palmatifida), Pinabeto (Pseudotsuga menziensii var. glauca), Ciprés de Moctezuma (Taxodium huegelii)

Fauna 
Guajolote, pavo salvaje (Meleagris gallopavo), Venado cola blanca (Odocoileus virginianus ), Pecari de collar (Pecari tajacu), Venado cola blanca (Odocoileus virginianus ), Puma (Puma concolor), Coyote (Canis latrans), Conejo castellano o serrano (Sylvilagus floridanus), Liebre cola negra (Lepus californicus), águila real (Aquila chrysaetos), Codorníz de moctezuma (Cyrtonyx montezumae), Chichimoco (Tamias bulleri), Búho moteado (Strix occidentalis), Serpiente de cascabel (Crotalus lepidus), Trogón orejón (Euptilotis neoxenus), Guacamaya verde (Ara militaris), Pato friso (Anas strepera), Cerceta ala azul, pato media luna (Anas discors), Pato cucharón norteño (Anas clypeata), Codorniz cotuí (Colinus virginianus), Paloma ala blanca (Zenaida asiatica), Paloma huilota (Zenaida macroura), Tórtola Cola Larga (Columbina inca), Tórtola Coquita (Columbina passerina), Topote del pacífico (Poecilia butleri), Murciélago negruzco, murcielaguito oscuro (Myotis nigricans), Jaguarundi, leoncillo (Puma yagouaroundi), Nutria de río (Lontra longicaudis), Jaguar (Panthera onca), Ocelote, tigrillo (Leopardus pardalis), Culebra nocturna ojo de gato (Hypsiglena torquata), Culebra ciempiés del Pacífico (Tantilla calamarina), Culebra real coralillo (Lampropeltis triangulum), Iguana negra (Ctenosaura pectinata)

Especies microendemicas 
 Víbora cascabel ocelada (Crotalus polystictus), Víbora cascabel transvolcánica (Crotalus triseriatus), Trébol de la pradera (Dalea nobilis), Rata canguro de Phillip (Dipodomys phillipsii), Sardina norteña (Dorosoma smithi), Sardinita agua dulce (Lile gracilis), Matalote chuime (Moxostoma austrinum), Zazal (Stevia rzedowskii), Lagartija nocturna de Sánchez (Xantusia sanchezi)

Especies endémicas 
Matorral de Sombra (Abelia occidentalis), Asterácea (Acourtia rigida), Rana Cara de Niño (Agalychnis dacnicolor), Miembro de la Raíz de Serpiente (Asterácea) (Ageratina oligocephala), Sándara (Ageratina palmeri), Zacatonero Cinco Rayas (Amphispiza quinquestriata), Cebollín (Allium glandulosum), Colibrí berilo (Amazilia berillyna), Sapo de la Meseta (Anaxyrus compactilis), Abaniquillo Oaxaqueño (Anolis nebuloides), Madroño (Arbutus occidentalis), Murciélago Frutero Peludo (Artibeus hirsutus), Araxi (Asclepias mcvaughii), Huico Llanero (Aspidoscelis costata), Escobilla (Baccharis multiflora), Lagarto Alicante del Popocatépetl (Barisia imbricata), Orégano (Brickellia secundiflora), Rascador cejas verdes (Arremon vrenticeps), Tepozán Cimarrón (Buddleja parviflora), Sapo Jaspeado, Sapo Marmoleado (Incilius marmoreus), Sapo Pinero (Incilius occidentalis), Casique Mexicano (Cassiculus melanicterus), Matraca Serrana (Campylorhynchus gularis), Chipe Rojo (Cardellina rubra), Pasto de zonas pantanosas (Carex marianensis), Zorzal Mexicano (Catharus occidentalis), Culebra Terrestre Narigona (Conopsis nasus), Murciélago Mula Mexicano (Corynorhinus mexicanus), Bise'Ebeero (Cosmos intercedens), Rana Ladradora de Smith (Craugastor hobartsmithi), Rana Ladradora Costeña (Craugastor occidentalis), Rana Ladrona Sonora (Craugastor vocalis), Ahuitule (Critoniopsis uniflora), Cascabel Obscuro de Querétaro (Crotalus aquilus), Víbora Cascabel de Saye (Crotalus basiliscus), Iguana Espinosa Mexicana (Ctenosaura pectinata), Pega hormiga (Cuphea lobophora), Chara de San Blas (Cyanocorax sanblasianus), Chilillo (Delphinium pedatisectum), Hierba de Cangrejo (Digitaria paniculata), Coyamol (Echeandia flavescens), Lili (Echeandia mexicana), Lili (Echeandia occidentalis), Rana Fisgona Deslumbrante (Eleutherodactylus nitidus), Salamanquesa (Plestiodon brevirostris), Eslizón Pigmeo del Sur (Eumeces parvulus), Crucetillo (Eupatorium leptodictyon), Lipa-Cai-Nofal (Euphorbia succedanea), Quetzal Orejón (Euptilotis neoxenus), Kidneywoods (Eysenhardtia platycarpa), Biznaga Barril de Acitrón (Ferocactus histrix), Limiscui (Ficus petiolaris), Periquito Catarino (Forpus cyanopygius), Nanche (Gaudichaudia subverticillata), Culebra Minera de Chihuahua (Geophis dugesii), Granatelo Mexicano (Granatellus venustus), Gumplant (Grindelia oxylepis), Gutierrezia (Gutierrezia sericocarpa), Guishi (Hilaria cenchroides), Rata Cambalachera de Allen (Hodomys alleni), Rana de Árbol de Montaña (Hyla eximia), Cotorra Serrana Occidental (Rhynchopsitta pachyrhyncha), Bagre del Lerma (Ictalurus dugesii), Bagre del Río Verde (Ictalurus mexicanus), Calandria Flancos Negros (Icterus abeillei), Sapo Sinaloense (Incilius mazatlanensis), Cuatolotlanenzi (Iostephane heterophylla), Quiebra Planto (Ipomoea stans), Casquito de Burro, Tortuga Pecho Quebrado Mexicana (Kinosternon integrum), Chichiltepetzacuxóchitl (Laelia speciosa), Culebra Real Potosina (Lampropeltis mexicana), Trepatroncos Mexicano (Lepidocolaptes leucogaster), Poace (Leptocoryphium villaregalis), Culebra Ojo de Gato del Suroeste (Leptodeira maculata), Culebra Perico Gargantilla (Leptophis diplotropis), Otác (Lithobates magnaocularis), Rana leopardo de Moctezuma (Lithobates montezumae), Ziix Hax Ano Quiij (Lithobates pustulosus), Biznaga de Flor Grande (Mammillaria longiflora), Pirul (Marina grammadenia), Estrella del zipolite (Matelea pilosa), Musaraña Desértica Sureña (Megasorex gigas), Carpintero Enmascarado (Melanerpes chrysogenys), Mulato Azul (Melanotis caerulescens), Rascador Nuca Canela (Melozone kieneri), Amor Seco (Mentzelia hispida), Estrellita , Azucena Silvestre (Milla biflora), Momoto corona canela (Momotus mexicanus), Zacate-pasto (Muhlenbergia aguascalientensis), Liendrilla de Pinar (Muhlenbergia dubia), Cola de Ratón (Muhlenbergia emersleyi), Zacatón, Soromuta (Muhlenbergia macroura), Zacate de Escobillas (Muhlenbergia robusta), Garambullo (Myrtillocactus geometrizans), Rata Cambalachera, Rata Cambalachera Diminuta, Rata Montera, Rata-Cambalachera Diminuta (Nelsonia neotomodon), Pañuelo (Norops nebulosus), Zacatonero Serrano (Oriturus superciliosus), Chachalaca Vientre Castaño (Ortalis wagleri), Ratón Arbustero (Peromyscus boylii subsp. glasselli), Ratón de Patas Blancas, Ratón Orejudo (Peromyscus difficilis), Ratón de Campo, Ratón Norteamericano (Peromyscus maniculatus), Ratón Silvestre de Patas Negras (Peromyscus melanocarpus), Ratón de Mesa, Ratón Montero Negruzco (Peromyscus melanophrys), Ratón Espiguero (Peromyscus spicilegus), Camaleón, Camaleón de Montaña, Lagartija Cornuda de Montaña, Tapayaxín (Phrynosoma orbiculare), Tuza (Pappogeomys bulleri), Ratón Piñonero (Peromyscus gratus), Salamanquesa Pata de Res (Phyllodactylus lanei), Alicante, Cincuate, Cincuate Mexicana, Culebra Sorda Mexicana (Pituophis deppei), Rana de Árbol de Pliegue Mexicana (Plectrohyla bistincta), Eslizón Encinero, Lincer de Encinos, Lagartija, Lagartija de Cola Azul,Lincer de Los Pinos (Plestiodon lynxe), Nardo de Varogachic (Polianthes densiflora), Nardo de Nueva Galicia (Polianthes platyphylla), Tlaconete Pinto (Pseudoeurycea belli), Gordolobo (Pseudognaphalium inornatum), Encino Chaparro (Quercus aristata Hook. & Arn.), Palo Blanco (Quercus laeta Liebm.), Encino Enano (Quercus macrophylla), Roble blanco (Quercus resinosa Liebm.), Rana de Moctezuma (Rana montezumae), Rana de Cascada (Rana pustulosa), Ratón Cosechero de la Sierra Madre Occidental, Ratón Cosechero Zacatecano, Ratón Silvestre de Zacatecas (Reithrodontomys zacatecae), Culebra Café de Occidente (Rhadinaea hesperia), Culebra Acotera, Culebra Café Coronada, Culebra de Collar, Hojarasquera Corona (Rhadinaea laureata), Murciélago Amarillo de Orejas Largas (Rhogeesa gracilis), Murciélago Amarillo Mayor (Rhogeessa alleni), Mirlo Azteca (Ridgwayia pinicola), Hediondilla (Roldana lineolata), Culebra Chata de Baird, Culebra Parchada de Baird,Culebra Rayada (Salvadora bairdi), Cuijera (Salvadora mexicana), Lagartija Escamosa de Dugués (Sceloporus dugesii), Lagartija Espinosa Jalisciense,Lagartija-Escamosa Dorso Carinado (Sceloporus heterolepis), Chintete Común, Lagartija Escamosa, Lagartija Escamuda, Roño Espinoso, Lagartija Espinosa del Pacifico (Sceloporus horridus), Lagartija Espinosa Menor (Sceloporus jarrovi minor), Lagartija Espinosa de Nelson (Sceloporus nelsoni), Lagartija Escamosa de Salvin (Sceloporus salvini), Culebra Listonada de Montaña Cola Larga, Llanerita (Sceloporus scalaris), Espinosa, Lagartija Escamuda (Sceloporus spinosus), Lagartija Escamosa Barrada (Sceloporus torquatus), Ardilla Arborícola (Sciurus nayaritensis), Rata Algodonera Oreja Blanca (Sigmodon leucotis), Rata Híspida Jalisciense (Sigmodon mascotensis), Musaraña Coluda de Jalisco (Sorex emarginatus), Musaraña de Montaña (Sorex vagrans monticola), Gorrión de Worthen (Spizella wortheni), Culebra Parda Mexicana (Storeria storerioides), Vencejo Nuca Blanca (Streptoprocne semicollaris), Ninfa Mexicana (Thalurania ridgwayi), Culebra Listonada Errante (Thamnophis errans), Culebra de Agua (Thamnophis scaliger), Salta paredfeliz (Thryothorus felix), Saltapared sinaloense (Thryothorus sinaloa), Falsa Nauyaca Mexicana (Trimorphodon tau), Teocintle (Tripsacum zopilotense), Saltapared cola larga (Tryomanes bewickii), Mirlo dorso canela (Turdus rufopalliatus), Vireo amarillo (Vireo hypochryseus), Vireón alerquín (VireolanIus melitophrys), Gorrión Serrano (Xenospiza baileyi), Cucharita de Río (Gobiesox fluviatilis), Rana de Árbol de Tierras Altas (Smilisca dentata), (Mexianthus mexicanus), Palo prieto (Mimosa rosei), (Muhlenbergia depauperata), (Muhlenbergia longiglumis), (Muhlenbergia polycaulis), Miotis canelo (Myotis fortidens), Atzatzamolli (Nymphaea gracilis), (Odontotrichum multilobum), Rata-arrocera de pantano (Oryzomys palustris), (Panicum decolorans), (Pedicularis glabra), (Perymenium uxoris), (Pinus maximartinezii), (Polyanthes geminiflora ), (Psacalium amplum), (Psacalium megaphyllum), (Psacalium platylepis), (Psacalium sinuatum), Encino enano (Quercus coccolobifolia), (Rana magnaocularis), (Ruellia jaliscana), (Rynchospora jaliscensis), (Salvia keerlii), (Salvia ramamoorthyana), Lagartija escamosa de suelo (Sceloporus utiformis), (Schoenocaulon jaliscense), (Sedum minimum ), (Senecio filaris), (Senecio guadalajarensis), (Senecio stoechadiformis), (Senecio toluccanus), Rata de la caña del pacífico (Sigmodon alleni), (Sinclairia palmeri), Culebra de tierra de michoacán (Sonora michoacanensis), (Stevia trifida), (Stipa eminens), Amapola (Tabebuia palmeri), (Tagetes pringlei), Culebra encapuchada de Bocourt (Tantilla bocourti), Culebra de agua de panza negra (Thamnophis melanogaster), (Tigridia mexicana), Rnica (Trixis angustifolia), Lagartija de Árbol del Pacífico (Urosaurus bicarinatus), (Verbesina culminicola), (Verbesina oxylepis), (Vernonia autumnalis), (Vernonia bealliae), Ahuitule (Vernonia salicifolia), (Viguiera grahamii), (Viguiera linearis), (Viguiera pringlei), (Yucca jaliscensis), Nopal arrastradillo (Opuntia spraguei)

Conservation
The area was designated a protected forest area and watershed in August 1949. It was redesignated a Natural resources protection area in 2002.

Objetivo de conservación 
Proteger, manejar y restaurar los ecosistemas presentes en el area de protección de recursos naturales "cuenca alimentadora del distrito nacional de riego043, rio ameca" para conservar la vegetación de la cuenca asi como los suelos y mantener la recarga de los acuíferos que garanticen a largo plazo el abastecimiento de agua para el desarrollo sustentable de esta region

Servicios ambientales 
Proteger, manejar y restaurar los ecosistemas presentes en el area de protección de recursos naturales "cuenca alimentadora del distrito nacional de riego043, rio ameca" para conservar la vegetación de la cuenca asi como los suelos y mantener la recarga de los acuíferos que garanticen a largo plazo el abastecimiento de agua para el desarrollo sustentable de esta region

References

Protected areas of the Sierra Madre Occidental
Protected areas of Aguascalientes
Protected areas of Durango
Protected areas of Jalisco
Protected areas of Nayarit
Protected areas of Zacatecas
Natural resources protection areas of Mexico
Protected areas of the Trans-Mexican Volcanic Belt